SM UC-70 was a German Type UC II minelaying submarine or U-boat in the German Imperial Navy during World War I. The U-boat was ordered on 12 January 1916 and was launched on 7 August 1916. She was commissioned into the German Imperial Navy on 20 November 1916 as SM UC-70. In ten patrols UC-70 was credited with sinking 33 ships, either by torpedo or by mines laid. On 28 August 1918, UC-70 was spotted lying submerged on the sea bottom and attacked by a Blackburn Kangaroo patrol aircraft of No. 246 Squadron RAF and then was then sunk by depth charges from the British destroyer . The wreck is a Protected Wreck managed by Historic England.

Design
A German Type UC II submarine, UC-70 had a displacement of  when at the surface and  while submerged. The submarine was powered by two six-cylinder four-stroke diesel engines each producing  (a total of ), two electric motors producing , and two propeller shafts.

UC-70 was fitted with six  mine tubes, eighteen UC 200 mines, three  torpedo tubes (one on the stern and two on the bow), seven torpedoes, and one  Uk L/30 deck gun. Her complement was twenty-six crew members.

Summary of raiding history

Loss
UC-70 was depth charged and sunk off Whitby, Yorkshire on 28 August 1918 with the loss of all 31 crew. The wreck was given protected status by Historic England in 2017.

References

Notes

Citations

Bibliography

External links

German Type UC II submarines
U-boats commissioned in 1916
U-boats sunk by British warships
U-boats sunk by depth charges
U-boats sunk in 1918
Maritime incidents in 1918
World War I minelayers of Germany
World War I shipwrecks in the North Sea
World War I submarines of Germany
1916 ships
Ships lost with all hands